Poladlı or Poladly or Polatlu or Polatly may refer to:
Poladlı, Agdam, Azerbaijan
Poladlı, Aghjabadi, Azerbaijan
Poladlı, Gadabay, Azerbaijan
Poladlı, Gobustan, Azerbaijan
Poladlı, Qubadli, Azerbaijan
Poladlı, Tartar, Azerbaijan